Aranya Rodan (English Cry in the wildness), is a 1993 Indian Odia film directed by Biplab Ray Chaudhuri, based on the novel Ashanta Arayana by Odia writer Satakadi Hota. The film was selected for the Indian Panorama at the International Film Festival of India.

Synopsis 

Kalyani (Priyambada Ray) is a journalist, who is investigating the rape and subsequent murder of a tribal woman by a police man in rural Orissa. She adopts the child of the dead woman and starts getting involved with the tribals' lives even as her own married life has its share of problems.

Cast 

 Pariyambada Ray
 Sarat Pujari
 Lalatendu Rath
 Raicharan Das
 Ma. Ramdas
 Murmu

Music 

 Shantunu Mahapatra - Music
 Laxman Marandi - Lyricist
 Sarojini Hembrum - Playback

References

External links 
 Film Data Base of 'Aranya Rodan' in nfaipune.nic.in
 Cast & Crew of 'Aranya Rodan' in movies.yahoo.com
 Casting & Crew of 'Aranya Rodan' in www.citwf.com
 

1993 films
1990s Odia-language films